Paysafecard (as a brand stylized in lowercase) is a prepaid online payment method based on vouchers with a 16-digit PIN code, independent of bank account, credit card, or other personal information. Customers can purchase vouchers at local sales outlets and pay online by entering the code at the checkout of the respective website (e. g. an online game). Paysafecard codes are not designated to be passed by mail or telephone.

Paysafecard is issued and distributed country-wise; cross-border and cross-currency usage is possible within some limits. The scope of services and partner webshops varies by country. In most countries, a personal account called my paysafecard for uploading PINs is available. Starting in Austria in 2000, as of 2018 paysafecard is available in over 40 countries. Two former competitors, Dutch Wallie and British Ukash, have been absorbed into paysafecard.

In 2013, paysafecard was acquired by British digital wallet provider Skrill, and in 2015 as part of the Skrill Group by the Optimal Payments Group, a global online payment processing provider regulated in the United Kingdom. Optimal Payments subsequently rebranded as Paysafe Group.

Name: paysafecard and Paysafe 
While the brand name of the payment method has always been paysafecard, in practice it is often shortened to "Paysafe",
the "card" part also being translated into other languages.

In 2015, paysafecard became a part of the multinational Optimal Payments online payment corporation, which subsequently rebranded as Paysafe Group. The group now directly offers certain products and services under the Paysafe brand. Paysafecard, however, continues to be a subsidiary brand of the Paysafe Group in its own right, alongside some others, like the digital wallets Skrill and Neteller.

Some sources erroneously interpret Paysafe to be the name of the company originally issuing the paysafecard product, and sometimes suggest this to be the core company of the Paysafe Group.

Geographical extension 
As of 2018 paysafecard is issued in over 40 countries—covering most of Europe and North America, Australia and New Zealand, and some countries in Western Asia and South America.

Countries with paysafecard available include Argentina, Australia, Austria, Belgium, Brazil, Bulgaria, Canada, Croatia, Cyprus, the Czech Republic, Denmark, Finland, France, Georgia, Germany, Greece, Hungary, Ireland, Italy, Kuwait, Latvia, Lithuania, Luxembourg, Malta, Mexico, Montenegro, Netherlands, New Zealand, Norway, Peru, Poland, Portugal, Romania, Saudi Arabia, Serbia, Slovakia, Slovenia, Spain, Sweden, Switzerland, Turkey, the United Arab Emirates, the United Kingdom, the United States and Uruguay.

Acceptance 
Web offers payable with paysafecard include online games, social media, telecommunication, music, and others. The scope of websites accepting paysafecard varies per country for several reasons. The most widespread use are online games; for example, League of Legends accepts paysafecard in 41 countries as of 2018. Examples of other partners accepting paysafecard in 20 or more countries include 
PlayStation 4,
Steam,
Guild Wars,
Second Life,
Skype,
Facebook
and Newegg.

History

Early years 
The company behind paysafecard is based in Vienna, Austria. It was founded in 2000 by four Austrians, including the first CEO Armin Sageder, as paysafecard.com Wertkarten AG ("paysafecard.com prepaid card Inc."), later transferred into a GmbH, a private limited company. Technical partner providing expertise and the original hardware was IBM Austria. The following year, paysafecard also launched in Germany. In 2004, co-founder Michael Müller assumed the role of CEO.

In 2005, paysafecard received an EU funding under the eTEN program supporting electronic services with a trans-European dimension. Subsequently, paysafecard launched in Slovenia, Greece, Slovakia, Spain and the United Kingdom.
In 2008, British subsidiary Prepaid Services Company Ltd. received an EU-wide e-money licence by the British Financial Services Authority (FSA), later the Financial Conduct Authority (FCA) under the Financial Services and Markets Act 2000, expanding a small e-money issuers certificate valid for the United Kingdom in 2006.
This authorised the company to issue e-money throughout the European Union. 
Also in 2008, paysafecard Switzerland obtained a license as a financial intermediary.

Acquisitions 
In August 2011, paysafecard absorbed Dutch competitor Wallie. In February 2013, Skrill, one of the largest payment services providers in Europe completed the acquisition of paysafecard.com Wertkarten AG. A year later, CEO Michael Müller left paysafecard and handed over to his brother Udo Müller. In November 2014, Skrill acquired British paysafecard competitor Ukash and merged it into paysafecard. In August 2015, Skrill group competitor Optimal Payments group completed the acquisition of Skrill group, including paysafecard, and subsequently rebranded as Paysafe Group. On the 1st of November 2021, Paysafe completed the acquisition of viafintech, the company that developed viacash (originally Barzahlen).

Functionality

Basic function 
Core of paysafecard is a 16-digit PIN, sold (most usually) on a printout, a pre-printed prepaid card, or as a digital information online. In the respective countries, paysafecard is available in denominations ranging from 10 to 100 euros, United States dollars, pounds sterling, and Australian dollars, and approximately equivalent sums in other currencies, e. g. 100-1000 Norwegian kroner.

When paying in an online shop, the user enters the 16 digit PIN, and the amount tendered is deducted from the paysafecard balance. Hence, the same PIN code can be used multiple times until the full balance has been consumed. For larger sums it is possible to combine up to ten paysafecard PINs.

The current balance of each paysafecard as well as its transaction history and production date can be viewed at the official site by entering the respective 16 PIN code.

Business model and fees 
The paysafecard company earns varying proportions of merchants' transaction volumes, shared with the distribution partners.  They do not charge any fees to the customer for purchasing and using paysafecard, as well as checking the balance of a PIN or its payment history online, but at the following situations fees have to be paid / will be deducted:
 Twelve months after purchasing a paysafecard customers will be charged an administrative fee of €3 (or like sums) on remaining balance per month, which will be automatically deducted from their credit. 
 A reimbursement of credit remaining on a paysafecard PIN requires the customer to provide their personal details, a copy of a valid form of photographic identification, bank account details and the details of the paysafecard PIN in question. Usually a reimbursement fee will be deducted from the remaining paysafecard credit, in Germany amounting to €7.50.
 For payments in a different currency than associated with the PIN obtained, paysafecard will charge a fee of usually 2%.

Issuing 
In contrast to in-house vouchers and prepaid products, paysafecard is sold and accepted at distinct companies ("Third Party Billing"). For this reason, dealing with them is a banking transaction and requires either a banking partner or a banking licence. In the beginning, paysafecard was issued by the BAWAG P.S.K. in Austria and the Commerzbank in Germany.

Since 2008, paysafecard's subsidiary company Prepaid Services Company Limited holds a licence of the Financial Conduct Authority (resp. its predecessor Financial Services Authority) "to issue electronic money (e-money) and provide payment services", valid for all countries in the European Economic Area. Therefore in those countries, paysafecard is issued by Prepaid Services without external banking partner. Further, Swiss paysafecard subsidiary paysafecard.com Schweiz GmbH is a licensed financial intermediary in Switzerland and issuer of the product also in other countries, e.g. in Australia.

In the United States, payment regulations require an external banking partner issuing paysafecard, a role assumed by The Bancorp Bank.

Distribution 
In the beginning, paysafecard was sold as pre-printed scratchcard. Starting in 2002, paysafecard is usually sold as a printout called "eVoucher" by the company, a uniquely numbered receipt from an in-store sales terminal. Paysafecard is distributed country-wise by varying external partners, which is why also shop types offering paysafecard vary by country. Typical examples include newsagents, petrol stations, post offices, pharmacies, supermarkets, electrical retailers and vending machines. The world-wide number of points of sales sums up to 600,000.

Limitations 
Paysafecard has limitations manifesting especially when used for online gambling. Payments (thus also deposits in gambling accounts) with paysafecard are inherently limited to the amount of €1000; for classic paysafecard (not my paysafecard) this amount has been lowered to €250 in 2016 due to compliance regulations. Many other online payment methods allow a multiple of those amounts. Also, in contrast to other payment methods, accountless paysafecard does not enable a customer to withdraw money. However, a withdrawal to my paysafecard is possible and supported by several online casinos, with President of Global Gaming Zak Cutler emphasising that consumer protection and safety is a focus of its casino withdrawal offering.

Unlike credit cards, paysafecard does not give the opportunity to overdraw your fundings, which may be appreciated as a means of spending control.

Additional services 
The company offers supplementary services to classic paysafecard, especially in most countries an online account called my paysafecard to upload PINs and to do repeated payments more comfortably. At the payment checkout of a webshop, customers may choose between entering a PIN and signing in to their my paysafecard account. The account also includes a loyalty program called my PLUS - doing payments will earn you points that can be exchanged for different benefits.

In several countries, paysafecard also issues a prepaid paysafecard Mastercard.

Paysafecash 
Barcode (e-Cash) payment solution Paysafecash was launched in 2018 by paysafecard. It is based on a barcode generated in the online checkout of an app, account, wallet or webshop when Paysafecash has been chosen as the post payment or deposit option. The generated barcode can be sent to a mobile phone via a text message or an e-mail, uploaded to a mobile wallet, or printed out. The customer shows the barcode at the nearest Paysafecash payment store, where it is scanned and the amount due can be paid with cash. Payment stores are to be found via a location finder within the Paysafecash app or on the Paysafecash webpage.

Paysafecash was created for cash-reliant consumers who do not possess a credit or debit card, or do not want to disclose their financial data when making online purchases or paying bills. It allows the use of traditional cash for digital payments in multiple industries such as financial services, rent payments, government and utility bills, e-commerce, and others. Retail and neobanks can offer new services to their customers, as Paysafecash integration in their banking app provides an option for cash deposits to digital bank accounts at a brick-and-mortar store.

Geographical extension 
As of 2022, Paysafecash is available in about 30 countries in Europe and North America.

Acceptance 
Paysafecash is accepted in more than 200,000 brick-and-mortar Paysafecash partner stores globally.

Functionality 
Users select Paysafecash in the online checkout page as their desired payment or deposit method, load the generated barcode into their wallet, send it to their mobile phone or print it out.

They can then find the nearest Paysafecash payment store using the online search function. Once the barcode is scanned by the cashier at the payment store, the open amount can be paid.

Recent developments 
In March 2021, Paysafe expanded its partnership with North American online rent payment platform RentMoola to allow tenants to use Paysafecash as a payment form.

Paysafe announced in May 2021 a deal with Repay Holdings Corporation to enable Repay merchants and lenders to accept cash payments at Paysafe's about 70,000 partner locations in the US through Paysafecash.

In June 2021, the company announced two partnerships to expand Paysafecash's global presence: one with cloud-based payment platform IntelliPay in the US, and one with financial intermediary company SweePay to allow Swiss residents to use Paysafecash as a payment option.

Paysafe announced in September 2021 a partnership to enable customers of app-based Dutch bank bunq to add cash to their accounts through Paysafecash in 21 European countries

Security 
Paysafecard is a payment method that enables the customer to stay anonymous not only to the merchants, but also with respect to the payment provider. The amount of money exposed to loss by accident or fraud is limited to the denomination of the voucher purchased; no bank account or credit card data are put at risk.

Nonetheless, there are varying instances of abuse:
 Like all systems that only require entering data on a website, paysafecard users may fall victim to phishing techniques. By mimicking the official website or a merchant's checkout page, fraudsters may trick users into entering their PINs and use the credit for themselves. A special instance are so-called "paysafecard hacks", allegedly doubling the value of your paysafecard.
 In common low-tech versions of this phishing, fraudsters offer goods, services, or cash prizes demanding a commitment fee, and ask for paysafecard PINs by mail or phone (or scans of the card) for payment. No goods or services are ever delivered in such cases.
 In the early 2010s, paysafecard was criticized as being abused by criminals for anonymous payments — by means of uploading prepaid credit cards, including stolen ones. In September 2010, German computer magazine Computer Bild propagated a quick legal regulation. Indeed a new money-laundering law was passed in Germany, effective at the start of 2012. It obliged customers of anonymous prepaid methods (like paysafecard) to undergo an identification procedure when surpassing a monthly spending amount of 100 €.
 Mainly from 2012 to 2014 cases were reported of fraudsters calling at gas stations, trying to obtain paysafecard PINs from the salespersons by pretending to be paysafecard personnel. Two cases in Vorarlberg, Austria, summed up to a financial damage over 6000 €.
 Starting in 2012, paysafecard and other prepaid payment methods (like then-competitor Ukash and Bitcoin) have been abused by ransomware, claiming to originate from the German Federal Criminal Police Office. The ransomware locks customers' computers and may threaten to erase their hard drives, unless a fine is paid. However, computers are not unlocked even when the fine is paid by the customer. paysafecard suggests to remove related viruses and trojans by following instructions provided by Botcrawl.com and other websites.
 Some scam websites claim to offer free paysafecard PINs under labels such as "promo PSC", luring internet users into subscription traps and click fraud, and not providing any service in return. Worse versions of this type of scam offer a free "Paysafe generator" and install a ransomware virus.
Paysafecard sets clear that PINs are only to be entered at authorised online shops, and never to be passed in any other way. The payment method is never used for governmental fines or reminder fees.

Awards 
From 2009 onwards, paysafecard has won several Paybefore Awards (since 2021 Pay Awards), issued by the US Paybefore media group, a daughter of Informa, with a focus on prepaid electronic payment solutions. 
The first of those awards was 2009 Best Non-U.S. Prepaid Program. Other examples include 2012 Most Innovative Prepaid Solution Europe and 2016 Best Online or Mobile Commerce Solution.

In the annual contest Austria’s Leading Companies, awarding top businesses in all states of Austria and the entire republic, paysafecard has won 1st places in Vienna in 2015 and 2017, respectively ranking 3rd and 2nd in Austria overall.

In the 2018 Austrian Great Place to Work contest, paysafecard won 1st place in the category New Working World and Quality of Living, as well as 10th place among all medium-sized companies.

References

External links
 Official website
 Description at worldpay.com
 Trustpilot Reviews
 sitejabber Reviews

Digital currencies
Payment systems
Electronic funds transfer
Web applications
Financial services companies of Austria
Financial services companies established in 2000
Companies based in Vienna